Niara is a given name. Notable people with the given name include:

Niara Bely (c. 1790–1879), Luso-African queen and businesswoman
Niara Scarlett, British singer-songwriter
Niara Sudarkasa (born August 1938-2019), American scholar, educator, Africanist and anthropologist

See also
Niaraq